Widenhouse is a surname. Notable people with the surname include:

Bill Widenhouse (1929–1995), American racing driver
Dink Widenhouse (born 1932), American racing driver